The 204th New York State Legislature, consisting of the New York State Senate and the New York State Assembly, has been in session since January 2021, during the administrations of Governor Andrew Cuomo and Governor Kathy Hochul

State Senate

Senators

* Elected in a special election

State Assembly

Assembly members

Note: For brevity, the chairmanships omit the words "...the Committee on (the)..."

+Elected in a special election

References

New York (state) legislative sessions
2021 in New York (state)
New York